Godide (1876 in Mozambique – 31 July 1911 in Angra do Heroísmo), or Godide Nxumalo, also known as  António da Silva Pratas Godide, was a son of  Ngungunhane (or Gungunhana), the last ruler of the Gaza Empire, located in modern Mozambique. He was chosen by his father as putative heir to the throne.

After Ngungunhane was overthrown, Godide was captured by Portuguese troops and sent to Lisbon, accompanying his father into exile in the Azores islands. He was the last recognised heir of the Jamine dynasty of the Nguni people.

References

External links
Ngungunhane
Nota biográfica de Gungunhana
Gungunhana no seu reino
O último discurso de Gungunhana
O império de Gaza

Gaza Empire
1876 births
1911 deaths